Janiodes is a genus of moths in the family Saturniidae first described by Karl Jordan in 1924.

Species
Janiodes bethulia (Druce, 1904)
Janiodes cuscoensis Brechlin & Meister, 2008
Janiodes dognini Jordan, 1924
Janiodes ecuadorensis (Dognin, 1890)
Janiodes laverna (Druce, 1890)
Janiodes manzanoi Pinas-Rubio, 2000
Janiodes napoensis Brechlin, Meister & Kaech, 2009
Janiodes nigropuncta (Druce, 1906)
Janiodes oxapampensis Brechlin & Meister, 2008
Janiodes praeclara Naumann et al., in press
Janiodes pichinchensis Brechlin, Meister & Kaech, 2009
Janiodes russea (Dognin, 1912)
Janiodes virgata Jordan, 1924

References

Cercophaninae